Chamaelaucium drummondii is a member of the family Myrtaceae endemic to Western Australia.

It blooms between August and January producing white-pink flowers.

Found along saline waterways and lakes and on sand plains in the Wheatbelt and Mid West regions of Western Australia where it grows in sand or clay soils over laterite or granite.

References

drummondii
Plants described in 1857